A-class destroyer may refer to:
A-class destroyer (1929), Royal Navy destroyers
A-class destroyer (1913), Royal Navy torpedo boat destroyers